This was the first edition of the tournament.

Sanchai and Sonchat Ratiwatana won the title, defeating Frederik Nielsen and David O'Hare 6–3, 6–2 in the final.

Seeds

Draw

References
 Main Draw

Gwangju Open - Doubles